Kshetrimayum Malemnganba Meitei (born 5 January 1992) is an Indian professional footballer who last played as a midfielder for Gokulam Kerala in the I-League.

Career

Early career
Born in Yairipok, Manipur, Meetei started playing football from the age of seven years after watching the Brazil national team during the 1998 FIFA World Cup. After having participated in many camps and development programs, Meetei began playing for NEROCA FC in 2007. While with NEROCA Meetei played in the Manipur State League, which was the top tier league for football in Manipur. He then signed for the North Imphal Sporting Association (NISA) in 2009 who were the reigning Manipur league winners and participants in the I-League 2nd Division.

After playing the final rounds of the 2nd Division in Bangalore, Meetei was signed by newly promoted HAL SC for the new I-League season. Two seasons later, after the club were relegated, Meetei signed for former I-League champions, Salgaocar, for the 2012–13 season.

Bengaluru FC
After spending one season at Salgaocar, he played for Bengaluru FC for two years from 2013-2014 and 2014-2015 season. During his two year tenure at the club, Bangaluru Fc won I-League in the debut season and Federation cup in the 2nd season. He made his debut for the side in the club's first ever I-League match against Mohun Bagan A.C. in which he started and played 80 minutes before being replaced by Robin Singh as Bengaluru drew the match 1–1. After the 2014–15 season, Meetei was released by the club. After his release, Meitei was listed as being eligible to be picked in the 2015 ISL Domestic Draft.

Mumbai FC
After playing for two years at Bangaluru FC, Meetei signed for Mumbai and played for them in the Mumbai Football League and subsequently 2015–16 I-League.

NEROCA F.C.
He recently played for NEROCA FC of Manipur (2016-2017) which became the first club from Manipur to be crowned winner of 2nd Division I-League after defeating Lonestar Kashmir 4–1 with a game in hand against Southern Samity FC.

NorthEast United
He is currently playing for NorthEast United in the Indian Super League for season 2017-18. He was picked by NorthEast United in the ISL Domestic Draft at a price cap of ₹16 lakhs.

Career statistics

Honours
Gokulam Kerala
Durand Cup: 2019

References

1992 births
Living people
Indian footballers
Hindustan Aeronautics Limited S.C. players
Salgaocar FC players
Bengaluru FC players
Mumbai FC players
Association football midfielders
People from Thoubal district
Footballers from Manipur
I-League players
I-League 2nd Division players
TRAU FC players
NorthEast United FC players
Gokulam Kerala FC players
Indian Super League players